The  was a seasonal rapid overnight train service operated by East Japan Railway Company (JR East) and Central Japan Railway Company (JR Central), which ran from  to  in Gifu Prefecture via the Tokaido Main Line. From 2009, the service had been offered approximately three weeks per year, corresponding to the spring, summer and year-end holiday seasons.

On 22 January 2021, both East Japan Railway Company (JR East) and Central Japan Railway Company (JR Central) announced the cessation of the Moonlight Nagara services with no replacements offered at the time, due to the increased popularity of highway buses and the ageing trains operated on the line. Since the train service had not operated during the summer and winter of 2020 due to the COVID-19 situation, this announcement made 29 March 2020, the last day of operations of the Nagara service. That day also marked the complete cessation of the "Moonlight"-branded services from Japan.

Rolling stock
From December 2013, Moonlight Nagara services were formed from 185 series electric multiple unit (EMU) 10-car (4+6-car) formations based at Omiya Depot.

 No smoking for all cars
 Passengers were unable to go between cars 4 and 5.
 Reserved = "Seat Reservation Ticket" (座席指定券) was required to board the train

Past rolling stock
 165 series EMUs
 373 series EMU 9-car formations
 183/189 series EMUs

From the introduction of the Moonlight Nagara service, trains normally comprised three three-car 373 series EMUs operated by JR Central and based at Shizuoka Depot. Additional Moonlight Nagara 91 and 92 trains also operated during busy seasons, and these comprised ten-car 183 series EMU sets owned by JR East and based at Tamachi Depot.

Station list

History
The Moonlight Nagara service was introduced on 16 March 1996. The name was taken from the Nagara River in Gifu Prefecture, and was formerly used for a semi express service which ran between Tokyo and Ōgaki from 1 June 1960 until 1 October 1965. 

Prior to World War II, as many as seven overnight round-trip services existed on this route. Rail services were cut dramatically in the wake of the war. The line briefly saw three to four daily overnight services in the late 1950s, but electrification of the line, coupled with the opening of the Tokaido Shinkansen high-speed line in 1964, reduced the need for overnight services.

The service's popularity declined in the 2000s due to competition from discounted overnight bus services. From 14 March 2009, the Moonlight Nagara stopped running on a daily basis and became a seasonal train running only during busy periods.

See also
 List of named passenger trains of Japan

References

Named passenger trains of Japan
East Japan Railway Company
Night trains of Japan
Railway services introduced in 1996
Railway services discontinued in 2020
1996 establishments in Japan
2020 disestablishments in Japan